The 2006 UC Davis football team represented the University of California, Davis as a member of the Great West Conference (GWC) during the 2006 NCAA Division I FCS football season. Led by 15th-year head coach Bob Biggs, UC Davis compiled an overall record of 6–5 with a mark of 1–3 in conference play, placing fourth in the GWC. 2006 was the 37th consecutive winning season for the Aggies. The team outscored their opponents 309 to 227  for the season. The Aggies played home games at Toomey Field in Davis, California.

Schedule

References

UC Davis
UC Davis Aggies football seasons
UC Davis Aggies football